Philotheca coateana is a species of flowering plant in the family Rutaceae and is endemic to Western Australia. It is a small shrub with small, elliptical leaves and white flowers with a pink midline, arranged singly on the ends of branchlets.

Description
The ten stamens are free from each other and hairy.

Taxonomy and naming
Philotheca coateana was first formally described in 1998 by Paul Wilson in the journal Nuytsia from specimens collected by the naturalist Kevin Coate near the Bulga Downs Station boundary. The specific epithet honours the collector of the type specimens.

Distribution
This species of philotheca grows near Menzies in the Coolgardie and Murchison biogeographic regions.

Conservation status
This species is classified as "Priority Three" by the Government of Western Australia Department of Parks and Wildlife meaning that it is poorly known and known from only a few locations but is not under imminent threat.

References

coateana
Flora of Western Australia
Sapindales of Australia
Plants described in 1998
Taxa named by Paul G. Wilson